Maurandya antirrhiniflora, known as roving sailor or (along with other similar species) climbing snapdragon, is a scrambling or climbing herbaceous perennial native to Mexico and the south western United States (California to Texas) where it grows in a variety of relatively dry habitats. It has sometimes been put into a separate genus as Maurandella antirrhiniflora.

Description

It has more-or-less triangular untoothed leaves and tubular flowers in various shades of pink, red or blue to violet with white bases. Unlike other species in the genus Maurandya, the flowers have closed "lips".

References

Plantaginaceae
Plants described in 1806
Taxa named by Alexander von Humboldt
Taxa named by Aimé Bonpland